European route E 841 is a European B class road in Italy, connecting the cities Avellino – Salerno.

Route 
 
 E842 Avellino
 E45 Salerno

External links 
 UN Economic Commission for Europe: Overall Map of E-road Network (2007)
 International E-road network

International E-road network
Roads in Italy